Aqa Baba Shiravand (also Romanized as Āqā Bābā Shīrāvand and Āqābābāshīrāvand; also known as Shīrāvand-e ‘Olyā) is a village in Darb-e Gonbad Rural District, Darb-e Gonbad District, Kuhdasht County, Lorestan Province, Iran.

Population
At the 2006 census, its population was 624, in 124 families.

References 

Towns and villages in Kuhdasht County